Del Puerto Canyon is the valley or canyon of Del Puerto Creek in Stanislaus County, California.

References 

Valleys of Stanislaus County, California
Diablo Range